1-Bromohexane is organobromine compound with formula Br(CH2)5CH3. It is a colorless liquid.

Synthesis and reactions
Most 1-bromoalkanes are prepared by free-radical addition of hydrogen bromide to the 1-alkene. These conditions lead to anti-Markovnikov addition, giving the 1-bromo derivative.

1-Bromohexane undergoes reactions expected of simple alkyl bromides. It can form Grignard reagents. It reacts with potassium fluoride to give the corresponding fluorocarbons.

See also
 Bromoalkanes
 Bromocyclohexane

References

Bromoalkanes